Jaipur is the capital of Rajasthan state, India. 

Jaipur, Jaypur, Jeypore, or Joypur may also refer to:

Places
 Jaipur, Buldhana, Maharashtra
 Jaipur, Maharashtra, in Hingoli district
 Jaipur, Mancherial district, Telangana
 Jaipur district,  a district of the state of Rajasthan
 Jaipur division, an administrative unit of Rajasthan state
 Jaipur State, the Jaipur princely state
 Jaypur, Purulia, West Bengal, India
 Jeypore, the largest town in the Koraput district of Orissa, India
 Joypur, Assam, a town in Dibrugarh district, Assam, India
 Joypur, Bankura, West Bengal, India
 Joypur, Bankura (community development block), West Bengal, India
 Joypur, Purulia, West Bengal, India

Constituencies
 Jaipur Lok Sabha constituency, a Lok Sabha parliamentary constituency of Rajasthan
 Joypur, Purulia Assembly constituency in Purulia district, West Bengal, India

Other
 Jaipur (card game), a card game designed by Sébastien Pauchon and published by Asmodee
 Jaipur (horse), an American Thoroughbred racehorse
 Jaipur Airport, near the capital of Rajasthan state

See also
 Jayapura (disambiguation)